Neuburgia tubiflora is a species of plant in the Loganiaceae family. It is endemic to Papua New Guinea.

References

Endemic flora of Papua New Guinea
tubiflora
Vulnerable plants
Taxonomy articles created by Polbot